Bragg's Mill may refer to:-

West Memphis, Arkansas, which was known as Bragg's Mill until 1927.
Bragg's Mill, Ashdon, a windmill in Essex, England.